Kid A is the fourth studio album by the English rock band Radiohead, released on 2 October 2000 by Parlophone. It was recorded with their producer, Nigel Godrich, in Paris, Copenhagen, Gloucestershire and Oxfordshire.

After the stress of promoting Radiohead's 1997 album OK Computer, the songwriter, Thom Yorke, wanted to depart from rock music. Drawing influence from electronic music, ambient music, krautrock, jazz and 20th-century classical music, Radiohead used instruments such as modular synthesisers, the ondes Martenot, brass and strings. They processed guitar sounds, incorporated samples and loops, and manipulated their recordings with software. Yorke wrote impersonal and abstract lyrics, cutting up phrases and assembling them at random.

In a departure from industry practice, Radiohead released no singles or music videos and conducted few interviews and photoshoots. Instead, they released short animated "blips", and became one of the first major acts to use the internet for promotion. Bootlegs of early performances were shared on filesharing services, and Kid A was leaked before release. In 2000, Radiohead toured Europe in a custom-built tent without corporate logos.

Kid A debuted at the top of the UK Albums Chart and became Radiohead's first number-one album on the Billboard 200 in the US, where it sold more than 207,000 copies in its first week. Its departure from Radiohead's earlier sound divided listeners, and some dismissed it as pretentious, deliberately obscure, or derivative. However, it later attracted acclaim; at the end of the decade, Rolling Stone, Pitchfork and the Times ranked Kid A the greatest album of the 2000s, and in 2020 Rolling Stone ranked it number 20 on its updated list of the "500 Greatest Albums of All Time". Like OK Computer, it won the Grammy Award for Best Alternative Album and was nominated for the Grammy Award for Album of the Year. It has been certified platinum in Australia, Canada, France, Japan, the US and the UK.

A second album of material from the sessions, Amnesiac, was released eight months later. Kid A Mnesia, an anniversary reissue compiling Kid A, Amnesiac and previously unreleased material, was released in 2021.

Background 
Following the critical and commercial success of their 1997 album OK Computer, the members of Radiohead suffered burnout. The songwriter, Thom Yorke, became ill, describing himself as "a complete fucking mess ... completely unhinged". He was troubled by new acts he felt were imitating Radiohead and became hostile to the music media. He told The Observer: "I always used to use music as a way of moving on and dealing with things, and I sort of felt like that the thing that helped me deal with things had been sold to the highest bidder and I was simply doing its bidding. And I couldn't handle that."

Yorke suffered from writer's block and could not finish writing songs on guitar. He became disillusioned with the "mythology" of rock music, feeling the genre had "run its course". He began to listen almost exclusively to the electronic music of artists signed to the record label Warp, such as Boards of Canada, Aphex Twin and Autechre. Yorke said: "It was refreshing because the music was all structures and had no human voices in it. But I felt just as emotional about it as I'd ever felt about guitar music." He liked the idea of his voice being used as an instrument rather than having a leading role, and wanted to focus on sounds and textures instead of traditional songwriting.

Yorke bought a house in Cornwall and spent his time walking the cliffs and drawing, restricting his musical activity to playing the grand piano he had recently bought. "Everything in Its Right Place" was the first song he wrote. He described himself as a "shit piano player", with little knowledge of electronic instruments: "I remember this Tom Waits quote from years ago, that what keeps him going as a songwriter is his complete ignorance of the instruments he's using. So everything's a novelty. That's one of the reasons I wanted to get into computers and synths, because I didn't understand how the fuck they worked. I had no idea what ADSR meant."

The guitarist Ed O'Brien had hoped Radiohead's fourth album would comprise short, melodic guitar songs, but Yorke said: "There was no chance of the album sounding like that. I'd completely had it with melody. I just wanted rhythm. All melodies to me were pure embarrassment." The bassist, Colin Greenwood, said: "We felt we had to change everything. There were other guitar bands out there trying to do similar things. We had to move on."

Recording 
Radiohead were building their own studio in Oxfordshire, which Yorke wanted to use as the German band Can had used their studio in Cologne, recording everything they played and then editing it down. However, the studio would not be complete until late 1999, so the band began work in Guillaime Tell Studios, Paris, in January 1999.

Radiohead worked with the OK Computer producer Nigel Godrich and no deadline. Yorke, who had the greatest control, was still facing writer's block. His new songs were incomplete, and some consisted of little more than sounds or rhythms; few had clear verses or choruses. Yorke's lack of lyrics created problems, as these had provided points of reference and inspiration for his bandmates in the past.

The group struggled with Yorke's new direction. According to Godrich, Yorke did not communicate much, and according to Yorke, Godrich "didn't understand why, if we had such a strength in one thing, we would want to do something else". The lead guitarist, Jonny Greenwood, feared "awful art-rock nonsense just for its own sake". His brother Colin did not enjoy Yorke's Warp influences, finding them "really cold". The other band members were unsure of how to contribute, and considered leaving. O'Brien said: "It's scary – everyone feels insecure. I'm a guitarist and suddenly it's like, well, there are no guitars on this track, or no drums."

Radiohead experimented with electronic instruments including modular synthesisers and the ondes Martenot, an early electronic instrument similar to a theremin, and used software such as Pro Tools and Cubase to edit and manipulate their recordings. They found it difficult to use electronic instruments collaboratively; according to Yorke, "We had to develop ways of going off into corners and build things on whatever sequencer, synthesiser or piece of machinery we would bring to the equation and then integrate that into the way we would normally work." O'Brien began using sustain units, which allow guitar notes to be sustained infinitely, combined with looping and delay effects to create synthesiser-like sounds.

In March, Radiohead moved to Medley Studios in Copenhagen for two weeks, which were unproductive. The sessions produced about 50 reels of tape, each containing 15 minutes of music, with nothing finished. In April, Radiohead resumed recording in a mansion in Batsford Park, Gloucestershire. The lack of deadline and the number of incomplete ideas made it hard to focus, and the group held tense meetings. They agreed to disband if they could not agree on an album worth releasing.

In July, O'Brien began keeping an online diary of Radiohead's progress. Radiohead moved to their new studio in Oxfordshire in September. In November, Radiohead held a live webcast from their studio, featuring a performance of new music and a DJ set. By 2000, six songs were complete. In January, at Godrich's suggestion, Radiohead split into two groups: one would generate a sound or sequence without acoustic instruments such as guitars or drums, and the other would develop it. Though the experiment produced no finished songs, it helped convince O'Brien of the potential of electronic instruments.

On 19 April 2000, Yorke wrote on Radiohead's website that they had finished recording. Having completed over 20 songs, Radiohead considered releasing a double album, but felt the material was too dense. Instead, they saved half the songs for their next album, Amnesiac, released the following year. Yorke said Radiohead split the work into two albums because "they cancel each other out as overall finished things. They come from two different places." He observed that deciding the track list was not just a matter of choosing the best songs, as "you can put all the best songs in the world on a record and they'll ruin each other". He cited the later Beatles albums as examples of effective sequencing: "How in the hell can you have three different versions of 'Revolution' on the same record and get away with it? I thought about that sort of thing." Agreeing on the track list created arguments, and O'Brien said the band came close to breaking up: "That felt like it could go either way, it could break ... But we came in the next day and it was resolved." The album was mastered by Chris Blair in Abbey Road Studios, London.

Tracks 
Radiohead worked on the first track, "Everything in Its Right Place", in a conventional band arrangement in Copenhagen and Paris, but without results. In Gloucestershire, Yorke and Godrich transferred the song to a Prophet-5 synthesiser, and Yorke's vocals were processed in Pro Tools using a scrubbing tool. O'Brien and the drummer, Philip Selway, said the track helped them accept that not every song needed every band member to play on it. O'Brien recalled: "To be genuinely sort of delighted that you'd been working for six months on this record and something great has come out of it, and you haven't contributed to it, is a really liberating feeling." Jonny Greenwood described it as a turning point for the album: "We knew it had to be the first song, and everything just followed after it."

Yorke wrote an early version of "The National Anthem" when the band was still in school. In 1997, Radiohead recorded drums and bass for the song, intending to develop it as a B-side for OK Computer, but decided to keep it for their next album. For Kid A, Greenwood added ondes Martenot and sounds sampled from radio stations, and Yorke's vocals were processed with a ring modulator. In November 1999, Radiohead recorded a brass section inspired by the "organised chaos" of Town Hall Concert by the jazz musician Charles Mingus, instructing the musicians to sound like a "traffic jam".

The strings on "How to Disappear Completely" were performed by the Orchestra of St John's and recorded in Dorchester Abbey, a 12th-century church about five miles from Radiohead's Oxfordshire studio. Radiohead chose the orchestra as they had performed pieces by Penderecki and Messiaen. Jonny Greenwood, the only Radiohead member trained in music theory, composed the string arrangement by multitracking his ondes Martenot. According to Godrich, when the orchestra members saw Greenwood's score "they all just sort of burst into giggles, because they couldn't do what he'd written, because it was impossible – or impossible for them, anyway". The orchestra leader, John Lubbock, encouraged them to experiment and work with Greenwood's ideas. Concerts director Alison Atkinson said the session was "more experimental" than the orchestra's usual bookings.

 "Idioteque" samples two computer music pieces, Paul Lansky's "Mild und Leise" and Arthur Kreiger's "Short Piece". Both samples were taken from Electronic Music Winners, a 1976 experimental music LP which Jonny Greenwood stumbled upon while the band was working on Kid A. The track was built from a drum machine pattern Greenwood created with a modular synthesiser and a sample from "Mild und Leise". He gave the 50-minute recording to Yorke, who took a short section of it and used it to write the song. Yorke also referred to electronic dance music when talking about "Idioteque", and said that the song was "an attempt to capture that exploding beat sound where you're at the club and the PA's so loud, you know it's doing damage".

"Motion Picture Soundtrack" was written before Radiohead's debut single "Creep" (1992), and Radiohead recorded a version on piano during the OK Computer sessions. For Kid A, Yorke recorded it on a pedal organ, influenced by the songwriter Tom Waits. The band added harp samples and double bass, attempting to emulate the soundtracks of 1950s Disney films. Radiohead also worked on several songs they did not complete until the recording sessions for future albums, including "Nude", "Burn the Witch" and "True Love Waits".

Music

Style and influences 

Kid A incorporates influences from electronic artists on Warp Records such as 1990s IDM artists Autechre and Aphex Twin; 1970s Krautrock bands such as Can; the jazz of Charles Mingus, Alice Coltrane and Miles Davis; and abstract hip hop from the Mo'Wax label, including Blackalicious and DJ Krush. Yorke cited Remain in Light (1980) by Talking Heads as a "massive reference point". Björk was another major influence, particularly her 1997 album Homogenic, as was the Beta Band. Radiohead attended an Underworld concert which helped renew their enthusiasm in a difficult moment.

The string orchestration for "How to Disappear Completely" was influenced by Polish composer Krzysztof Penderecki. Jonny Greenwood's use of the ondes Martenot on this and several other Kid A songs was inspired by Olivier Messiaen, who popularised the instrument and was one of Greenwood's teenage heroes. Greenwood described his interest in mixing old and new music technology, and during the recording sessions Yorke read Ian MacDonald's Revolution in the Head, which chronicles the Beatles' recordings with George Martin during the 1960s. The band also sought to combine electronic manipulations with jam sessions in the studio, stating their model was the German group Can.

Kid A has been described as a work of electronica, experimental rock, post-rock, alternative rock, post-prog, ambient, electronic rock, art rock, and art pop. Though guitar is less prominent than on previous Radiohead albums, guitars were still used on most tracks. "Treefingers", an ambient instrumental, was created by digitally processing O'Brien's guitar loops. Many of Yorke's vocals were manipulated with effects; for example, his vocals on the title track were simply spoken, then vocoded with the ondes Martenot to create the melody.

Lyrics 
Yorke's lyrics on Kid A are less personal than on earlier albums, and instead incorporate abstract and surreal themes. He cut up phrases and assembled them at random, combining cliches and banal observations; for example, "Morning Bell" features repeated contrasting lines such as "Where'd you park the car?" and "Cut the kids in half". Yorke denied that he was "trying to get anything across" with the lyrics, and described them as "like shattered bits of mirror ... like pieces of something broken. ... it's not like I'm trying to get anything across." 

Yorke cited David Byrne's approach to lyrics on Remain in Light as an influence: "When they made that record, they had no real songs, just wrote it all as they went along. Byrne turned up with pages and pages, and just picked stuff up and threw bits in all the time. And that's exactly how I approached Kid A." Radiohead used Yorke's lyrics "like pieces in a collage ... [creating] an artwork out of a lot of different little things". The lyrics are not included in the liner notes, as Radiohead felt they could not be considered independently of the music, and Yorke did not want listeners to focus on them.

Yorke wrote "Everything in Its Right Place" about the depression he experienced on the OK Computer tour, feeling he could not speak. The refrain of "How to Disappear Completely" was inspired by R.E.M. singer Michael Stipe, who advised Yorke to relieve tour stress by repeating to himself: "I'm not here, this isn't happening". The refrain of "Optimistic" ("try the best you can / the best you can is good enough") was an assurance by Yorke's partner, Rachel Owen, when Yorke was frustrated with the band's progress. The title Kid A came from a filename on one of Yorke's sequencers. Yorke said he liked its "non-meaning", saying: "If you call [an album] something specific, it drives the record in a certain way."

Artwork 

The Kid A artwork and packaging was created by Yorke with Stanley Donwood, who has worked with Radiohead since their 1994 EP My Iron Lung. Donwood painted on large canvases with knives and sticks, then photographed the paintings and manipulated them with Photoshop. While working on the artwork, Yorke and Donwood became "obsessed" with the Worldwatch Institute website, which was full of "scary statistics about ice caps melting, and weather patterns changing"; this inspired them to use an image of a mountain range as the cover art. Donwood said he saw the mountains as "some sort of cataclysmic power".

Donwood was inspired by a photograph taken during the Kosovo War depicting a square metre of snow full of the "detritus of war", such as military equipment and cigarette stains. He said: "I was upset by it in a way war had never upset me before. It felt like it was happening in my street." The red swimming pool on the album spine and disc was inspired by the 1988 graphic novel Brought to Light by Alan Moore and Bill Sienkiewicz, in which the number of people killed by state terrorism is measured in swimming pools filled with blood. Donwood said this image "haunted" him during the recording of the album, calling it "a symbol of looming danger and shattered expectations". Yorke and Donwood cited a Paris exhibition of paintings by David Hockney as another influence.

Yorke and Donwood made many versions of the album cover, with different pictures and different titles in different typefaces. Unable to pick one, they taped them to cupboards of the studio kitchen and went to bed. According to Donwood, the choice the next day "was obvious". In October 2021, Yorke and Donwood curated an exhibition of Kid A artwork at Christie's headquarters in London.

Promotion 
Radiohead minimised their involvement in promotion for Kid A, conducting few interviews or photoshoots. Though "Optimistic" and promotional copies of other tracks received radio play, Radiohead released no singles from the album. Yorke said this was to avoid the stress of publicity, which he had struggled with on OK Computer, rather than for artistic reasons.

No advance copies of Kid A were circulated, but it was played under controlled conditions for critics and fans. Radiohead were careful to present it as a cohesive work rather than a series of separate tracks. Rather than give EMI executives their own copies, they had them listen to the album in its entirety on a bus from Hollywood to Malibu. Rob Gordon, the vice president of marketing at Capitol Records, the American subsidiary of Radiohead's label EMI, praised the album but said promoting it would be a "business challenge". Promotional copies of Kid A came with stickers prohibiting broadcast before September 19. At midnight, it was played in its entirety by the London radio station Xfm. MTV2, KROQ, and WXRK also played the album in its entirety.

Rather than agree to a standard magazine photoshoot for Q, Radiohead supplied digitally altered portraits, with their skin smoothed, their irises recoloured, and Yorke's drooping eyelid removed. The Q editor Andrew Harrison described the images as "aggressively weird to the point of taking the piss ... All five of Radiohead had been given the aspect of gawking aliens." Yorke said: "I'd like to see them try to put these pictures on a poster." Q projected the images onto the Houses of Parliament, placed them on posters and billboards in the London Underground and on the Old Street Roundabout, and had them printed on key rings, mugs and mouse mats, to "turn Radiohead back into a product".

Instead of releasing traditional music videos for Kid A, Radiohead commissioned dozens of 10-second videos featuring Donwood artwork they called "blips", which were aired on music channels and distributed online. Pitchfork described them as "context-free animated nightmares that radiated mystery", with "arch hints of surveillance". Five of the videos were serviced as exclusives to MTV, and "helped play into the arty mystique that endeared Radiohead to its core audience", according to Billboard. Much of the promotional material featured pointy-toothed bear characters created by Donwood. The bears originated in stories Donwood made for his young children about teddy bears who came to life and ate the "grown-ups" who had abandoned them.

Internet 

Though Radiohead had experimented with internet promotion for OK Computer in 1997, by 2000 online music promotion was not widespread, with record labels still reliant on MTV and radio. Donwood wrote that EMI was not interested in the Radiohead website, and left him and the band to update it with "discursive and random content".

To promote Kid A, Capitol created the "iBlip", a Java applet that could be embedded in fan sites. It allowed users to stream the album, and included artwork, photos and links to order Kid A on Amazon. It was used by more than 1000 sites, and the album was streamed more than 400,000 times. Capitol also streamed Kid A through Amazon, MTV.com and heavy.com, and ran a campaign with the peer-to-peer filesharing service Aimster, allowing users to swap iBlips and Radiohead-branded Aimster skins.

Three weeks before release, Kid A was leaked online and shared on the peer-to-peer service Napster. Asked whether he believed Napster had damaged sales, Capitol president Ray Lott likened the situation to unfounded concern about home taping in the 1980s and said: "I'm trying to sell as many Radiohead albums as possible. If I worried about what Napster would do, I wouldn't sell as many albums." Yorke said Napster "encourages enthusiasm for music in a way that the music industry has long forgotten to do".

Tour 
Radiohead rearranged the Kid A songs to perform them live. O'Brien said, "You couldn't do Kid A live and be true to the record. You would have to do it like an art installation ... When we played live, we put the human element back into it." Selway said they "found some new life" in the songs when they came to perform them.

In mid-2000, months before Kid A was released, Radiohead toured the Mediterranean, performing Kid A and Amnesiac songs for the first time. Fans shared concert bootlegs online. Colin Greenwood said: "We played in Barcelona and the next day the entire performance was up on Napster. Three weeks later when we got to play in Israel the audience knew the words to all the new songs and it was wonderful." Later that year, Radiohead toured Europe in a custom-built tent without corporate logos, playing mostly new songs. The tour included a homecoming show in South Park, Oxford, with supporting performances by Humphrey Lyttelton (who performed on Amnesiac), Beck and Sigur Rós. According to the journalist Alex Ross, the show may have been the largest public gathering in Oxford history.

Radiohead also performed three concerts in North American theatres, their first in nearly three years. The small venues sold out rapidly, attracting celebrities, and fans camped overnight. In October, Radiohead performed on the American TV show Saturday Night Live; the performance shocked viewers expecting rock songs, with Jonny Greenwood playing electronic instruments, the house brass band improvising over "The National Anthem", and Yorke dancing erratically to "Idioteque". Rolling Stone described the Kid A tour as "a revelation, exposing rock and roll humanity" in the songs. In November 2001, Radiohead released I Might Be Wrong: Live Recordings, comprising performances from the Kid A and Amnesiac tours.

Sales 
Kid A reached number one on Amazon's sales chart, with more than 10,000 pre-orders. It debuted at number one on the UK Albums Chart, selling 55,000 copies in its first day – the biggest first-day sales of the year and more than every other album in the top ten combined. Kid A also debuted at number one on the US Billboard 200, selling more than 207,000 copies in its first week. It was Radiohead's first US top-20 album, and the first US number one in three years for any British act. Kid A also debuted at number one in Canada, where it sold more than 44,000 copies in its first week, and in France, Ireland and New Zealand. European sales slowed on 2 October 2000, the day of release, when EMI recalled 150,000 faulty CDs. By June 2001, Kid A had sold 310,000 copies in the UK, less than a third of OK Computer sales. It is certified platinum in the UK, Australia, Canada, France, Japan and the US.

Critical reception 

Kid A was widely anticipated; Spin described it as the most anticipated rock record since Nirvana's In Utero. According to Andrew Harrison, the editor of Q, journalists expected it to provide more of the "rousing, cathartic, lots-of-guitar, Saturday-night-at-Glastonbury big future rock moments" of OK Computer. Months before its release, Pat Blashill of Melody Maker wrote: "If there's one band that promises to return rock to us, it's Radiohead."

After Kid A had been played for critics, many bemoaned the lack of guitar, obscured vocals, and unconventional song structures, and some called the album "a commercial suicide note". The Guardian wrote of the "muted electronic hums, pulses and tones", predicting that it would confuse listeners. In Mojo, Jim Irvin wrote that "upon first listen, Kid A is just awful ... Too often it sounds like the fragments that they began the writing process with – a loop, a riff, a mumbled line of text, have been set in concrete and had other, lesser ideas piled on top." The Guardian critic Adam Sweeting wrote that "even listeners raised on krautrock or Ornette Coleman will find Kid A a mystifying experience", and that it pandered to "the worst cliches" about Radiohead's "relentless miserabilism".

Several critics felt Kid A was pretentious or deliberately obscure. The Irish Times bemoaned the lack of conventional song structures and panned the album as "deliberately abstruse, wilfully esoteric and wantonly unfathomable ... The only thing challenging about Kid A is the very real challenge to your attention span." In the New Yorker, the novelist Nick Hornby wrote that it was "morbid proof that this sort of self-indulgence results in a weird kind of anonymity rather than something distinctive and original". The Melody Maker critic Mark Beaumont called it "tubby, ostentatious, self-congratulatory, look-ma-I-can-suck-my-own-cock whiny old rubbish ... About 60 songs were started that no one had a bloody clue how to finish." Alexis Petridis of The Guardian described it as "self-consciously awkward and bloody-minded, the noise made by a band trying so hard to make a 'difficult' album that they felt it beneath them to write any songs". Rolling Stone published a piece by Michael Krugman and Jason Cohen mocking Kid A as humourless, derivative and lacking in songs. They wrote: "Because it was decided that Radiohead were Important and Significant last time around, no one can accept the album as the crackpot art project it so obviously is." 

Some critics felt Kid A was unoriginal. In the New York Times, Howard Hampton dismissed Radiohead as a "rock composite" and wrote that Kid A "recycles Pink Floyd's dark-side-of-the-moon solipsism to Me-Decade perfection". Beaumont said Radiohead were "simply ploughing furrows dug by DJ Shadow and Brian Eno before them". The Irish Times felt the ambient elements were inferior to Eno's 1978 album Music For Airports and its "scary" elements inferior to Scott Walker's 1995 album Tilt. Select wrote: "What do they want for sounding like the Aphex Twin circa 1993, a medal?" In a retrospective, the journalist Rob Sheffield wrote that the "mastery of Warp-style electronic effects" had appeared "clumsy and dated" at the time of Kid A's release. In an NME editorial, James Oldham wrote that the electronic influences were "mired in compromise", with Radiohead still operating as a rock band, and concluded: "Time will judge it. But right now, Kid A has the ring of a lengthy, over-analysed mistake." Rob Mitchell, the co-founder of Warp, felt Kid A represented "an honest interpretation of [Warp] influences" and was not gratuitously electronic. He predicted it might one day be seen in the same way as David Bowie's 1977 album Low, which alienated some Bowie fans but was later acclaimed.

AllMusic gave Kid A a favourable review, but wrote that it "never is as visionary or stunning as OK Computer, nor does it really repay the intensive time it demands in order for it to sink in". The NME review was also positive, but described some songs as "meandering" and "anticlimactic", and concluded: "For all its feats of brinkmanship, the patently magnificent construct called Kid A betrays a band playing one-handed just to prove they can, scared to commit itself emotionally." In Rolling Stone, David Fricke called Kid A "a work of deliberately inky, often irritating obsession ... But this is pop, a music of ornery, glistening guile and honest ache, and it will feel good under your skin once you let it get there."

Spin said Kid A was "not the act of career suicide or feat of self-indulgence it will be castigated as", and predicted that fans would recognise it as Radiohead's best and "bravest" album. Billboard described it as "an ocean of unparalleled musical depth" and "the first truly groundbreaking album of the 21st century". The music journalist Robert Christgau wrote that Kid A was "an imaginative, imitative variation on a pop staple: sadness made pretty". The Village Voice called it "oblique oblique oblique ... Also incredibly beautiful." Brent DiCrescenzo of Pitchfork gave Kid A a perfect score, calling it "cacophonous yet tranquil, experimental yet familiar, foreign yet womb-like, spacious yet visceral, textured yet vaporous, awakening yet dreamlike". He concluded that Radiohead "must be the greatest band alive, if not the best since you know who". The piece was one of the first Kid A reviews posted online; shared widely by Radiohead fans, it helped popularise Pitchfork and became notorious for its "obtuse" writing.

At Metacritic, which aggregates ratings from critics, Kid A has a score of 80 based on 24 reviews, indicating "generally favourable reviews". It was named one of the best albums of 2000 by publications including the Los Angeles Times, Spin, Melody Maker, Mojo, NME, Pitchfork, Q, the Times, Uncut and the Wire. At the 2001 Grammy Awards, Kid A was nominated for Album of the Year and won for Best Alternative Album.

Legacy 

In the years following its release, Kid A attracted acclaim. In 2005, Pitchfork wrote that it had "challenged and confounded" Radiohead's audience, and subsequently "transformed into an intellectual symbol of sorts ... Owning it became 'getting it'; getting it became 'anointing it'." In 2015, Rob Sheffield of Rolling Stone likened Radiohead's change in style to Bob Dylan's controversial move to rock music, writing that critics now hesitated to say they had disliked it at the time. He described Kid A as the "defining moment in the Radiohead legend". A year later, Billboard argued that Kid A was the first album since Bowie's Low to have moved "rock and electronic music forward in such a mature fashion". In an article for Kid A's 20th anniversary, the Quietus suggested that the negative reviews had been motivated by rockism, the tendency among music critics to venerate rock music over other genres.

In a 2011 Guardian article about his critical Melody Maker review, Beaumont wrote that though his opinion had not changed, "Kid A status as a cultural cornerstone has proved me, if not wrong, then very much in the minority ... People whose opinions I trust claim it to be their favourite album ever." In 2014, Brice Ezell of PopMatters wrote that Kid A is "more fun to think and write about than it is to actually listen to" and a "far less compelling representation of the band's talents than The Bends and OK Computer". In 2016, Dorian Lysnkey wrote in The Guardian: "At times, Kid A is dull enough to make you fervently wish that they'd merged the highlights with the best bits of the similarly spotty Amnesiac ... Yorke had given up on coherent lyrics so one can only guess at what he was worrying about."

Radiohead denied that they had set out to create "difficult" music. Jonny Greenwood argued that the tracks were short and melodic, and suggested that "people basically want their hands held through 12 'Mull Of Kintyre's". Yorke said: "We're actually trying to communicate but, somewhere along the line, we just seemed to piss off a lot of people ... What we're doing isn't that radical." He recalled that the band had been "white as a sheet" before early performances on the Kid A tour, thinking they had been "absolutely trashed". At the same time, the reaction motivated them: "There was a sense of a fight to convince people, which was actually really exciting." He regretted having released no singles, feeling it meant much of the early judgement of the album came from critics.

Grantland credited Kid A for pioneering the use of internet to stream and promote music, writing: "For many music fans of a certain age and persuasion, Kid A was the first album experienced primarily via the internet – it's where you went to hear it, read the reviews, and argue about whether it was a masterpiece ... Listen early, form an opinion quickly, state it publicly, and move on to the next big record by the official release date. In that way, Kid A invented modern music culture as we know it." In his 2005 book Killing Yourself to Live, critic Chuck Klosterman interpreted Kid A as a prediction of the September 11 attacks.

Speaking at Radiohead's induction to the Rock and Roll Hall of Fame 2019, David Byrne of Talking Heads, one of Radiohead's formative influences, said: "What was really weird and very encouraging was that [Kid A] was popular. It was a hit! It proved to me that the artistic risk paid off and music fans sometimes are not stupid." In 2020, Billboard wrote that the success of Kid A,  despite its "challenging" content, established Radiohead as "heavy hitters in the business for the long run".

Accolades 
In 2020, Rolling Stone ranked Kid A number 20 on its updated "500 Greatest Albums of All Time" list, describing it as "a new, uniquely fearless kind of rock record for a new, increasingly fearful century ... [It] remains one of the more stunning sonic makeovers in music history." In previous versions of the list, Kid A ranked at number 67 (2012) and number 428 (2003). In 2005, Stylus and Pitchfork named Kid A the best album of the previous five years, with Pitchfork calling it "the perfect record for its time: ominous, surreal, and impossibly millennial".

In 2006, Time named Kid A one of the 100 best albums, calling it "the opposite of easy listening, and the weirdest album to ever sell a million copies, but ... also a testament to just how complicated pop music can be". At the end of the decade, Rolling Stone, Pitchfork and the Times ranked Kid A the greatest album of the 2000s. The Guardian ranked it second best, calling it "a jittery premonition of the troubled, disconnected, overloaded decade to come. The sound of today, in other words, a decade early." In 2021, Pitchfork readers voted Kid A the greatest album of the previous 25 years. In 2011, Rolling Stone named "Everything in Its Right Place" the 24th-best song of the 2000s, describing it as "oddness at its most hummable". "Idioteque" was named one of the best songs of the decade by Pitchfork and Rolling Stone, and Rolling Stone ranked it #33 on its 2018 list of the "greatest songs of the century so far".

(*) designates unordered list

Reissues 
Radiohead left EMI after their contract ended in 2003. After a period of being out of print on vinyl, Kid A was reissued as a double LP on 19 August 2008 as part of the "From the Capitol Vaults" series, along with other Radiohead albums. In 2007, EMI released Radiohead Box Set, a compilation of albums recorded while Radiohead were signed to EMI, including Kid A. On 25 August 2009, EMI reissued Kid A in a two-CD "Collector's Edition" and a "Special Collector's Edition" containing an additional DVD. Both versions feature live tracks, taken mostly from television performances. Radiohead had no input into the reissues and the music was not remastered. 

The EMI reissues were discontinued after Radiohead's back catalogue transferred to XL Recordings in 2016. In May 2016, XL reissued Kid A on vinyl, along with the rest of Radiohead's back catalogue. An early demo of "The National Anthem" was included in the special edition of the 2017 OK Computer reissue OKNOTOK 1997 2017. In February 2020, Radiohead released an extended version of "Treefingers", previously released on the soundtrack for the 2000 film Memento, to digital platforms.

On November 5, 2021, Radiohead released Kid A Mnesia, an anniversary reissue compiling Kid A and Amnesiac. It includes a third album, Kid Amnesiae, comprising previously unreleased material from the sessions. Radiohead promoted the reissue with singles for the previously unreleased tracks "If You Say the Word" and "Follow Me Around". Kid A Mnesia Exhibition, an interactive experience with music and artwork from the albums, was released on November 18 for PlayStation 5, macOS and Windows.

Track listing 

All songs written by Radiohead, except "Idioteque", which samples "Mild und Leise" by Paul Lansky and "Short Piece" by Arthur Kreiger.

 "Everything in Its Right Place" – 4:11
 "Kid A" – 4:44
 "The National Anthem" – 5:51
 "How to Disappear Completely" – 5:56
 "Treefingers" – 3:42
 "Optimistic" – 5:15
 "In Limbo" – 3:31
 "Idioteque" – 5:09
 "Morning Bell" – 4:35
 "Motion Picture Soundtrack" – 7:01
 Untitled hidden track – 0:52

Note: Track 10 ends at 3:20; includes an untitled hidden track from 4:17 until 5:09, followed by 1:51 of silence. On streaming services, the hidden track is listed as a separate track.

Personnel 
Credits adapted from liner notes.

Production
 Nigel Godrich – production, engineering, mixing
 Radiohead – production
 Gerard Navarro – production assistance, additional engineering
 Graeme Stewart – additional engineering
 Stanley – artwork 
 Tchock – artwork 
 Chris Blair – mastering

Additional musicians
 Orchestra of St John's – strings
 John Lubbock – conducting
 Jonny Greenwood – scoring
 Horns on "The National Anthem"
 Andy Bush – trumpet
 Steve Hamilton – alto saxophone 
 Martin Hathaway – alto saxophone 
 Andy Hamilton – tenor saxophone
 Mark Lockheart – tenor saxophone
 Stan Harrison – baritone saxophone
 Liam Kerkman – trombone
 Mike Kearsey – bass trombone
 Henry Binns – rhythm sampling on "The National Anthem"

Charts

Weekly charts

Year-end charts

Certifications and sales

Notes

References

Bibliography

Further reading 
 
 Ed's Diary: Ed O'Brien's studio diary from Kid A/Amnesiac recording sessions, 1999–2000 (archived at Green Plastic)
 Marzorati, Gerald. "The Post-Rock Band". The New York Times. 1 October 2000. Retrieved on 4 November 2010.
 "All Things Reconsidered: The 10th Anniversary of Radiohead's 'Kid A'" (a collection of articles). PopMatters. November 2010. Retrieved on 4 November 2010.

External links

2000 albums
Albums produced by Nigel Godrich
Ambient albums by English artists
Capitol Records albums
Electronic albums by English artists
Grammy Award for Best Alternative Music Album
Parlophone albums
Post-rock albums by English artists
Radiohead albums